Alexander Augustus Lyon (born December 9, 1992) is an American professional ice hockey goaltender for the Charlotte Checkers of the American Hockey League (AHL) while under contract to the Florida Panthers of the National Hockey League (NHL). He played collegiately for the Yale Bulldogs men's ice hockey team, competing in the ECAC.

Early life
Lyon was born on December 9, 1992, in Baudette, Minnesota. For the first seven years of his life, Lyon and his older sister Sam grew up on an island in Lake of the Woods, and he attended school for one year at a small schoolhouse. His parents were fishing lodge managers on the island, while their children took a rowboat to school. The Lyons moved back to mainland Minnesota in 2000, at which point Lyon began playing hockey. Of the 25 male students in Lyon's graduating class at Lake of the Woods High School, 15 played ice hockey for the varsity team, including Lyon. During his senior year in 2009–10, Lyon served as the goaltender for all 26 Lake of the Woods high school games. In those 26 games, he posted a .948 save percentage (SV%).

Playing career

NCAA
While at Yale University, Lyon was named Ivy League co-Rookie of the Year in 2014. After leading the nation in save percentage, shutouts and goals-against average, Lyon was presented with the Ken Dryden Award (given to the best goalie in the ECAC) his sophomore season, while receiving First-Team AHCA/CCM All-America, First-Team All-ECAC, First-Team All-New England as well as First-Team All-Ivy League honors. He was also the winner of the J. Murray Murdoch Award as Yale's Most Valuable Player.

Individual awards kept rolling in for Lyon after the 2015–16 season, as he repeated as Ken Dryden Award recipient and also landed spots on the All-ECAC First Team, the All-Ivy League First Team and the All-New England First Team for the second straight year.

Professional

Philadelphia Flyers
Lyon opted to forgo his senior season at Yale and signed an entry-level contract with the Philadelphia Flyers of the National Hockey League (NHL) on April 5, 2016.

Lyon made his first NHL start February 1, 2018 in a 4–3 loss to the New Jersey Devils. On February 18, 2018, Lyon recorded his first NHL win with the Flyers after replacing an injured Michal Neuvirth in the second period. Lyon saved 25 of 26 shots by the New York Rangers en route to a 7–4 victory.

On May 9, 2018, in a playoff win over the Charlotte Checkers, Lyon saved 94 of 95 shots faced in a record-setting 146 minutes 48 seconds, making it the longest game in AHL history. The game went to the fifth overtime, with the Phantoms winning 2–1.

On November 5, 2018, Lyon was recalled to Philadelphia following an injury to Michal Neuvirth. Lyon was again recalled to the Flyers on November 16.

On January 15, 2020, the Flyers recalled Lyon to the NHL following an injury to Carter Hart. On February 1, 2020, Lyon recorded his first NHL win since March 22, 2018.

Carolina Hurricanes

Following the 2020–21 season, his fifth within the Philadelphia Flyers organization, Lyon left as a free agent and was signed to a one-year, two-way contract with the Carolina Hurricanes on July 30, 2021. Lyon played the majority of the season with the Hurricanes' AHL affiliate Chicago Wolves, only tallying two games with the Hurricanes. With the Wolves, Lyon finished the regular season with 18 wins and 3 shutouts, earning him the Hap Holmes Memorial Award for the AHL goaltender with the lowest goals against average. He tallied two additional shutouts in the playoffs, including a 28-save shutout in the final game to win the Calder Cup.

Florida Panthers
As a free agent from the Hurricanes, Lyon signed a one-year, two-way contract to join the Florida Panthers on July 13, 2022.

International play

Lyon won bronze with the US National Team at the 2015 World Championships in the Czech Republic, seeing action in one game during the tournament.

Career statistics

Regular season and playoffs

Awards and honors

References

External links

 

1992 births
Living people
AHCA Division I men's ice hockey All-Americans
American men's ice hockey goaltenders
Carolina Hurricanes players
Cedar Rapids RoughRiders players
Charlotte Checkers (2010–) players
Chicago Wolves players
Florida Panthers players
Ice hockey players from Minnesota
Lehigh Valley Phantoms players
Omaha Lancers players
People from Baudette, Minnesota
Philadelphia Flyers players
Undrafted National Hockey League players
Yale Bulldogs men's ice hockey players